Carlos Marcenaro Hidalgo (12 August 1912 – 20 August 1988) was a Peruvian middle-distance runner. He competed in the men's 800 metres at the 1936 Summer Olympics.

References

External links
 

1912 births
1988 deaths
Athletes (track and field) at the 1936 Summer Olympics
Peruvian male middle-distance runners
Olympic athletes of Peru
Sportspeople from Lima
20th-century Peruvian people